is a Japanese international rugby union player who plays in the wing position.   He currently plays for the Panasonic Wild Knights in Japan's domestic Top League.

Early / Provincial Career

Kodama has played all of his senior club rugby in Japan with the Panasonic Wild Knights who he joined in 2015.

Super Rugby Career

Kodama was selected as a member of the first ever Sunwolves squad ahead of the 2016 Super Rugby season.   He played once during their debut campaign.

International

Kodama made his first senior international appearance for Japan in a match against South Korea on April 30, 2016 and marked his debut with an impressive 5 try haul.

Super Rugby Statistics

References

1992 births
Living people
Japanese rugby union players
Japan international rugby union players
Rugby union wings
Saitama Wild Knights players
Sunwolves players
Sportspeople from Kitakyushu
Japanese expatriate rugby union players
Expatriate rugby union players in Australia
Japanese rugby sevens players
Kobelco Kobe Steelers players
Melbourne Rebels players
Green Rockets Tokatsu players